Low Island is one of the many uninhabited Canadian arctic islands in Qikiqtaaluk Region, Nunavut. It is a Baffin Island offshore island located in Frobisher Bay just off the Bartlett Narrows, southeast of the capital city of Iqaluit. Other islands in the immediate vicinity include Culbertson Island, Mark Island, McAllister Island, Mitchell Island, and Precipice Island.

Another Low Island lies in the Milne Inlet of northern Baffin Island.

References

External links 
 Low Island (Nunavut) in the Atlas of Canada - Toporama; Natural Resources Canada
 Low Island (Nunavut) (Milne Inlet) in the Atlas of Canada - Toporama; Natural Resources Canada

Uninhabited islands of Qikiqtaaluk Region
Islands of Baffin Island
Islands of Frobisher Bay